Inanda may refer to:

 Inanda, Gauteng, a suburb of Johannesburg, South Africa
 Inanda, KwaZulu-Natal, a town outside Durban, South Africa
 Inanda, Sourou, a village of Burkina Faso
 , three ships of this name 
 1325 Inanda, asteroid